Trace amine-associated receptor 2 (TAAR2), formerly known as G protein-coupled receptor 58 (GPR58), is a protein that in humans is encoded by the TAAR2 gene. TAAR2 is coexpressed with Gα proteins; however,  its signal transduction mechanisms have not been determined.

Tissue distribution 
Human TAAR2 (hTAAR2) is expressed in the cerebellum, olfactory sensory neurons in the olfactory epithelium, and leukocytes (i.e., white blood cells), among other tissues. hTAAR1 and hTAAR2 are both required for white blood cell activation by trace amines in granulocytes. 

Using brain histochemistry staining of mice with LacZ insertion into TAAR2 gene histochemical reaction was found in the glomerular layer of the olfactory bulb, but intensive staining was found in the deeper layer as well. The histochemical reaction was observed in the fibers of the olfactory nerve, in the glomeruli of the glomerular layer, several short axon (SA) cells (outer plexiform layer or granular layer) and neuronal projections that were visualized throughout the depth of the olfactory bulb. Furthermore, LacZ staining was observed in the limbic areas of the brain receiving olfactory input, i.e., piriform cortex molecular area, hippocampus (CA1 field, pyramidal layer), hypothalamic lateral zone (zone incerta) and lateral habenula. In addition, a histochemical reaction was found in the midbrain raphe nuclei and primary somatosensory area of the cortex (layer 5). Real-time quantitative PCR with reverse transcription confirmed TAAR2 gene expression in the mouse brain areas such as the frontal cortex, hypothalamus, and brainstem.

Involvement in the functioning of monoamine systems 
TAAR2 knockout mice have significantly higher level of dopamine in the striatum tissue than wild-type littermates and lower level of norepinephrine in hippocampus. Also, they have lower levels of MAO-B expression in midbrain and striatum. A significantly higher number of the dopamine neurons was detected in TAAR2-KO mice in the substantia nigra pars compacta. TAAR2 knockout mice have significantly higher level of horizontal activity and lower immobilization time in forced swim test.

Involvement in adult neurogenesis 
It has been found that TAAR2 knockout mice have an increased number of neuroblast-like and proliferating cells in both subventricular and subgranular zones of the dentate gyrus in comparison to wild type animals. Furthermore, TAAR2 knockout mice have an increased the brain-derived neurotrophic factor (BDNF) level in the striatum.

A single nucleotide polymorphism nonsense mutation of the TAAR2 gene is associated with schizophrenia. TAAR2 is a probable pseudogene in 10–15% of Asians as a result of a polymorphism that produces a premature stop codon at amino acid 168.

Involvement in immune cell migration and function 
TCells, B Cells and Peripheral Mononuclear cells express TAAR2 mRNA.  Migration toward TAAR1 ligands required both TAAR1 and TAAR2 expression based on siRNA experiments.  In T cells, the same stimuli triggered cytokine secretion while in B cells Immunoglobulin secretion is triggered.

Possible Ligands 
3‐iodo‐thyronamine(T1AM) was identified as a nonselective ligand for TAAR2.
Addditional TAAR1 ligands,  p-tyramine and Beta-phenylethylamine(2-PEA) trigger TAAR2 dependant actions, though direct binding has not been demonstrated.

See also 
 Trace amine
 Trace amine-associated receptor

References 

G protein-coupled receptors